Lopholepis is a genus of South Asian plants in the grass family. The only known species is Lopholepis ornithocephala, native to Sri Lanka and to India (State of Tamil Nadu).

References

Chloridoideae
Monotypic Poaceae genera
Flora of the Indian subcontinent